Four ships in the United States Navy have been named USS Worden for John Lorimer Worden.

United States Navy ship names